The Government of Punjab, is the provincial government of the Pakistani province of Punjab. It is based in Lahore, the provincial capital. Its powers and structure are set out in the provisions of the Constitution, in which 41 districts come under its authority and jurisdiction. The government includes the cabinet, selected from members the Punjab Provincial Assembly, and the non-political civil staff within each department. The province is governed by a unicameral legislature with the head of government known as the Chief Minister. The Chief Minister, invariably the leader of a political party represented in the Assembly, selects members of the Cabinet. The Chief Minister and Cabinet are thus responsible for the functioning of government and are entitled to remain in office so long as it maintains the confidence of the elected Assembly. The head of the province is known as the Governor, appointed by the federal government, on behalf of the President, while the administrative boss of the province is Chief Secretary Punjab.

The Punjab province is the country's most populous region and is home to the Punjabis and various other groups. Neighbouring provinces of Pakistan are Sindh to the south, Balochistan to the south-west and the Khyber Pakhtunkhwa to the north-west, as well as  Azad Jammu and Kashmir to the north and Islamabad Capital Territory to the north-west. It also shares International border with Indian states of Punjab and Rajasthan to the east and Indian-administered Jammu and Kashmir to the north. The main languages are Punjabi and Urdu and the provincial capital is Lahore. The name Punjab literally translates from Persian into the words 'Panj' (پانج) five, and 'Aab' (آب) water respectively, which can be translated as "five water" (hence the poetic name land of the five rivers), referring to the Beas, Ravi, Sutlej, Chenab and Jhelum rivers. Part of the Indus river also lies in Punjab, but it is not considered one of the "five" rivers.

Departments
There are 41 departments in the Punjab government. Each Department is headed by a provincial Minister (elected member of the provincial assembly) and a provincial Secretary (a civil servant of usually BPS-20, 21, or BPS-22). All ministers report to the Chief Minister, who is the Chief Executive; and all secretaries report to Chief Secretary Punjab, who is a BPS-22 grade bureaucrat. The Chief Secretary is appointed by the Prime Minister of Pakistan.

In addition to these departments, there are several Autonomous Bodies and Attached Departments that report directly to either the Secretaries or the Chief Secretary.
Punjab is the largest Province by population. For better management, Sub Secretariat and Additional Inspector General (IG) South Punjab office in Multan was established by the government.

Legislature
The Punjab Assembly is a unicameral legislature with 297 elected members, 66 seats reserved for women and 8 seats reserved for non-Muslims)

See also

Governor of Punjab, Pakistan
Chief Minister of Punjab (Pakistan)
Speaker of the Provincial Assembly of Punjab
Leader of the Opposition Punjab
 Chief Secretary Punjab
 Provincial Assembly of the Punjab
 Flag of Punjab, Pakistan
 Pakistan
 Constitution of Pakistan
 Prime Minister of Pakistan
 President of Pakistan
 Supreme Court of Pakistan
 Balochistan
 Sindh
 Capital of Pakistan
 Punjab Irrigation Department

References

External links
 Government of the Punjab official website
 Official facebook page
 Information For Punjab Employees
 LATEST PUNJABI NEWS

 
Provincial Governments of Pakistan